John Wesley Brown (October 23, 1918 – March 3, 1999) was an American Negro league pitcher in the 1940s.

A native of Hamburg, Arkansas, Brown made his Negro leagues debut in 1944 with the Cleveland Buckeyes. He played five seasons for Cleveland through 1948, and was selected to play in the East–West All-Star Game in 1946. Brown died in Detroit, Michigan in 1999 at age 80.

References

External links
 and Seamheads
 John Brown at Arkansas Baseball Encyclopedia

1918 births
1999 deaths
Cleveland Buckeyes players
Baseball pitchers
Baseball players from Arkansas
People from Hamburg, Arkansas
20th-century African-American sportspeople